Nathan Nata Spira (1585 – 20 July 1633) was a Polish rabbi and kabbalist, who served as Chief Rabbi of Kraków. A student of Meir Lublin, Spira played an important role in spreading Isaac Luria's teachings throughout Poland.  Spira was the author of a number of works, most notably the Megaleh Amukot.

Biography
Spira descended from a rabbinical family, which traced its lineage as far back to Rashi, the noted 11th-century French commentator. He was named after his grandfather Nathan Nata Spira, who was rabbi in Hrodna and author of Mevo Shearim (1575) and Imrei shefer (1597). His father was Solomon Spira.

Spira had seven children, three sons and four daughters. 
While serving as Chief Rabbi of Kraków, Spira refused a salary.
He is buried in the Old Jewish cemetery in Kazimierz, Krakow.

Notes

References

External links
 Nathan Nata Shapiro, Chief Rabbi of Cracow, 1585-1633

1585 births
1633 deaths
Rabbis from Kraków
Kabbalists
16th-century Polish rabbis
17th-century Polish rabbis
Chief rabbis of cities